Johann Santner (21 April, 1840 in Sankt Jakob in Defereggen - 21 May, 1912 in Bozen) was a Tyrolean mountaineer and first climber to reach the summit of the Santnerspitze, which was later given his name in his honor, of the Schlern on 2 July, 1880. He also was the first climber on the Gran Cir.

Life 
Johann Santner came to Bozen in 1875 as a florist. In 1876 he became a member of the local branch of the Deutscher und Österreichischer Alpenverein.
The Schlern was his favorite mountain, he climbed it over 400 times - the last time in 1911 at the age of 71.

References 

 Hans Kiene: Die Entwicklung der Bozner Bergsteigerei in: Der Schlern 1926, pages 407-415
 Eduard Widmoser: Südtirol A-Z, 4th volume (O-Z), Innsbruck 1995, Südtirol-Verlag, page 195
 Bruno Mahlknecht: Santners Traum. Ein Bergsteiger und sein Denkmal, German-language daily Dolomiten, 15 September, 2004, page 19

External links
 website in German
 Austrian Biographical Lexicon of the Austrian Academy of Sciences

1840 births
1912 deaths
Austrian mountain climbers